The 1994 Tour de Romandie was the 48th edition of the Tour de Romandie cycle race and was held from 3 May to 8 May 1994. The race started in Marin and finished in Geneva. The race was won by Pascal Richard of the GB–MG Maglificio team.

General classification

References

1994
Tour de Romandie